Rio das Flores is a municipality located in the Brazilian state of Rio de Janeiro. Its population was 9,344 (2020) and its area is 478 km².

History

Before the arrival of the first Portuguese settlers in the 16th century, the region was inhabited by the Purí people. The region began to be colonized more intensively on the 19th century, during the “Coffee cycle”.  In 1851, a chapel was built dedicated to Santa Teresa, establishing the Parish of Santa Teresa of Valenca. With the coffee plantation, the region began to become very prosperous, to the point that in 1882, a railway station was opened in Rio das Flores to serve the coffee farms.

In 1890, the district emancipated from city of Valencia, becoming the village of Santa Teresa. In 1929 the village was elevated to city status and in 1943, was renamed "City of Rio das Flores." Currently, it has its economy based on agriculture and tourism.

Tourism in Rio das Flores

Rio das Flores offers great diversity of attractions for ecotourism, rural tourism, adventure and sports, religious tourism and historical and cultural - delighting visitors. The fertile lands of the valley and climate for coffee have attracted investments in the past for the construction of large farms, today visited by many tourists.

 Historic Coffee Farms:  In the early 19th century, the Paraiba Valley and Rio das Flores was just becoming a centerpiece of what has come to be known in Brazilian history as the “coffee cycle”. Visiting a historical coffee farm you will hear about powerful barons, strong slaves and demanding ladies in their beautiful homes. You can have lunch in a farm built in the early 1800s and visit the a historic farm with over 300 windows.
 Eco-turism: The beautiful mountains in the Rio das Flores region is a sideshow, with waterfalls, flora and fauna, unique landscapes, plus the Fazenda do Bananal beautiful trails into the tropical forest where you can see toucans, parrots and other exotic birds as well as the native fauna.
 Cultural Festivals:  Culinary, history and culture come together in Coffee, Cachaça and Chorinho annual festival and tour of attractions in the Paraiba River Valley in Rio de Janeiro State. Rio das Flores is part of the
 Sports Tourism: Besides exploring the local historic attractions, Rio das Flores hosts and sponsors several Sports Events that has achieved regional and national reputation such as Copa Rio das Flores de Futebol, Copa Vale do Café de Motocross, Motorcycle Annual Meeting and other. In 2012, Rio das Flores has launched a 6-year plan to explore the opportunities created by the World Cup 2014 and the 2016 Olympics that are to be hosted in Brazil.

List of Hotels In Rio Das Flores 
Rio Das Flores is not short of accommodation options, yet there are some hotels that combine stunning design and impeccable service to create an extra-luxurious experience. Therefore, we made a short list of hotels that are offering outstanding hospitality in Rio Das Flores.

Top Five hotels in Rio das Flores   

 Kings Boutique Hotel
 Pousada Luar do Sertão
 Hotel Fazenda União
 Pousada Lírios do Campo
 Pousada Rio das Flores

References

Municipalities in Rio de Janeiro (state)